Public art in the City of Sydney in New South Wales, Australia includes a wide range of works across a range of genres and for a range of purposes or combination of purposes. Some are purely artistic, some are commemorative, some are both. Some are monuments or memorials; some are also fountains and some are site-specific. In some buildings, such as Australia Square and Grosvenor Place by Harry Seidler as well as Aurora Place by Renzo Piano, the art is a component of the architect's intentions. Occasionally, works are removed or repositioned. The City of Sydney has a Public Art Policy and conservation work is carried on from time to time to maintain the works.

The materials used vary widely but include traditional marble (such as in Touchstone) and bronze (such as in the Archibald Fountain) as well as steel (such as in New Constellation and I Stay), concrete (such as in I Wish and Barrel Roll) and newer materials like aluminium (such as in Vine and Morpho). In the 21st century, kinetic, musical, and conceptual works began to appear.

Notable sculptors from around the world are represented in works on public display in Sydney. For example, Bertram Mackennal and Bronwyn Oliver were Australian; Gilbert Bayes and Henry Moore were British; François-Léon Sicard and Henri Alfred Jacquemart were French; Alexander Calder and Jenny Holzer are American; Kan Yasuda and Jun'ya Ishigami are Japanese.

Some memorials (such as the Levy Drinking Fountain) are in the form of a fountain; others (such as William Dalley) are in the form of a portrait statue. The Lawson Memorial commemorates a writer; John Christie Wright Memorial Fountain commemorates a sculptor; the Dobell Memorial commemorates a painter, the Morshead Fountain commemorates a soldier; Il Porcellino commemorates surgeons. As well as memorials to individuals or groups, matters of importance to Sydney such as navigation and the environment are also commemorated. The bronze portraits of James Cook, Arthur Phillip and Matthew Flinders also pay tribute to their skills in exploration and navigation.

Recurring themes include flora, children and classical or abstract allusion. Local flora is represented by sculptures such as Veil of Trees, Edge of the Trees  and Into the Trees II. Busby's Bore takes water as its subject; indigenous fauna is interpreted in Dancing Brolgas and domesticated animals in Trim, Islay and Mare and Foal. The lives and importance of children are acknowledged in the Tank Stream Fountain, Windlines, Youngsters and the memorial to Hans Christian Andersen. Some (such as The Offerings of Peace and The Offerings of War) employ classical references to convey an abstract meaning; others (such as Research) use abstracted forms to convey an idea.

Scope 
The list below is of works whose purpose is at least partly artistic and located in the New South Wales local government area of the City of Sydney. Outside the scope of this list are objects and installations that are: located in the suburbs of Greater Sydney; primarily water features, such as the fountains in Martin Place and in the forecourt of the Sydney Opera House; purely memorial objects such as the obelisk of botanist Allan Cunningham in the Royal Botanic Garden; and temporary exhibitions containing sculptures for sale such as those displayed in the annual Sculpture by the Sea exhibition or other public spaces like Barangaroo. The list is ordered chronologically and reveals how art has moved from the "pedagogical: kings, generals, prophets and heroes on pedestals, striking poses that were supposed to demonstrate power, nobility and citizenship" to "something ... that brings a site to life, triggers engagement, prompts discussion and reflection''.

Nineteenth century
Commissions for sculpture came from three main sources: the Church, the State and the private sponsor.  In the later part of the nineteenth century, there was "an active artistic relationship between Australia and Britain".

Twentieth century
By the twentieth century, the "basic traditional concepts of sculpture were challenged and radically undermined" giving rise to modern sculpture.

Twenty-first century
The 20th century sculptor Tom Bass described himself as "a maker of totems – symbolic, widely recognisable forms that embody social, cultural and spiritual meanings for a community – for a city, a corporate client or humanity in general", however, noted Sydney art critic John McDonald critic has commented that "only nowadays our malaise is cultural illiteracy." In the twenty-first century, citizens and viewers of public art no longer share a common theology and world-view nor a "general grasp of symbolism and numerology".  The absence of such a "shared cultural lexicon" means that sculptors have had to master more than form, medium, composition and technique to create meaning with their works.

See also 

 Sculpture by the Sea
 List of public art in Brisbane
 List of public art in the City of Westminster
 List of public art in the City of London

Further reading
 Booth, Chris, Edward Lucie-Smith, Gregory O'Brien and Ken Scarlett (2001) Sculpture in Europe, Australia & New Zealand,  Auckland, N.Z. : Godwit. 
 Scarlett, Ken (1980) Australian sculptors, West Melbourne, Vic. : Nelson. 
 Sturgeon, Graeme (1978) The development of Australian sculpture, 1788–1975, London: Thames and Hudson, 
 Sturgeon, Graeme (1991) Contemporary Australian sculpture, Roseville, NSW: Craftsman House,

References

External links
 

Public art
.Public art
Sydney
 01
Public art
Public art